Ship motions are defined by the six degrees of freedom that a ship, boat or any other craft can experience.

Reference axes 

The vertical/Z axis, or yaw axis, is an imaginary line running vertically through the ship and through its centre of mass . A yaw motion is a side-to side movement of the bow and stern of the ship.

The transverse/Y axis, lateral axis, or pitch axis is an imaginary line running horizontally across the ship and through the centre of mass. A pitch motion is an up-or-down movement of the bow and stern of the ship.

The longitudinal/X axis, or roll axis, is an imaginary line running horizontally through the length of the ship, through its centre of mass, and parallel to the waterline. A roll motion is a side-to-side or port-starboard tilting motion of the superstructure around this axis.

Rotational 

There are three special axes in any ship, called longitudinal, transverse and vertical axes. The movements around them are known as roll, pitch, and yaw respectively.

Roll 
The tilting rotation of a vessel about its longitudinal/X (front-back or bow-stern) axis. An offset or deviation from normal on this axis is referred to as list or heel. Heel refers to an offset that is intentional or expected, as caused by wind pressure on sails, turning, or other crew actions. The rolling motion towards a steady state (or list) angle due to the ship's own weight distribution is referred in marine engineering as heel. List normally refers to an unintentional or unexpected offset, as caused by flooding, battle damage, shifting cargo, etc.

Pitch
The up/down rotation of a vessel about its transverse/Y (side-to-side or port-starboard) axis. An offset or deviation from normal on this axis is referred to as trim or out of trim. A vessel that is pitching back and forth is usually termed to be hobby horsing.

Yaw 
The turning rotation of a vessel about its vertical/Z axis. An offset or deviation from normal on this axis is referred to as deviation or set. This is referred to as the heading of the boat relative to a magnetic compass (or true heading if referenced to the true north pole); it also affects the bearing.

Translational

Surge 
The linear longitudinal (front/back or bow/stern) motion imparted by maritime conditions, usually head or following seas, or by accelerations imparted by the propulsion system.

Sway 
The linear transverse (side-to-side or port-starboard) motion. This motion is generated directly either by the water and wind motion, particularly lateral wave motion, exerting forces against the hull or by the ship's own propulsion; or indirectly by the inertia of the ship while turning. This movement can be compared to the vessel's lateral drift from its course.

Heave 
The linear vertical (up/down) motion; excessive downward heave can swamp a ship.

Stabilization 
There are methods for both passive and active motion stabilization used in some designs. They include static hull features such as skegs and bilge keels, or active mechanical devices like counterweights, antiroll tanks and stabilizers.

See also

References 
 Society of Naval Architects and Marine Engineers (SNAME), "Principles of Naval Architecture", 1989, Vol. III, Pg.41, Section 3 - Ship Responses to Regular Waves
 Sukas, Omer Faruk; Kinaci, Omer Kemal; Bal, Sakir (2019). Theoretical background and application of MANSIM for ship maneuvering simulations MANSIM Lab. Ocean Engineering, 192, 106239. 
Nautical terminology